Jessie Royce Landis (born Jessie Medbury; November 25, 1896 – February 2, 1972) was an American actress. Her name is also seen as Jesse Royce-Landis. She remains perhaps best-known for her mother roles in the Hitchcock films To Catch a Thief (1955) and North by Northwest (1959).

Early life
Jessie Royce Landis was born Jessie Medbury in Chicago, Illinois, to Paul, an orchestra musician, and Ella Medbury. As per Ancestry.com, "Royce" does not  appear to have been her middle name by birth; her middle initial is cited as either "J." or "T". Her acting surname "Landis" derives from her first husband, although she was married twice more.

A scholarship that Landis received when she was 14 enabled her to attend the Hinshaw Dramatic School, which led to her acting two years later with the Evanston Stock Company.

Career

Landis was a stage actress for much of her career.

When her first husband's family encountered financial problems, she joined the North Shore Players as leading lady and director. In 1924, she left those dual roles to go on tour with The Highwayman.

Her Broadway career began with The Honor of the Family (1926) and ended with Roar Like a Dove (1964). In her early years on Broadway, she continued to act in touring productions. In the early 1950s, Landis spent three seasons acting on stage in London. Landis was recognized for the "best performance of the year" for her acting in Larger Than Life in London in 1950.

In the era of old-time radio, Landis had the roles of Irene Emerson on Helpmate and the housekeeper on The House on Q Street. She also was part of "a stellar cast of Broadway actors and actresses" in the cast of We Are Always Young on WOR in New York in 1941.

In the 1950s, she began appearing in movies as a character actress, such as her roles in To Catch a Thief (1955), and North by Northwest (1959), both starring Cary Grant and directed by Alfred Hitchcock. In North by Northwest she played Grant's character's mother, and in To Catch a Thief and The Swan (1956), she played the mother of characters played by Grace Kelly. Landis's appearance in North by Northwest earned her publicity for portraying Cary Grant's mother despite claiming to be nearly a year younger. Landis listed 1904 as the year of her birth. However, she had actually shaved eight years off her age. She appears in the 1900 U.S. Census as a 3-year-old born in November 1896; not old enough to be his (biological) mother.

Landis made many television appearances in programs such as The United States Steel Hour, Alfred Hitchcock Presents, and Boris Karloff's Thriller.

Landis' autobiography You Won't Be So Pretty (But You'll Know More) was published in 1954.

Marriages
Landis was married three times. In June 1915, she secretly married Perry Lester Landis, "a scion of one of Evanston's prominent families". Their son, Medbury Perry Landis, was born with Down syndrome in 1916. When she returned to the stage, he was put in a special school over his father's objections. The couple never lived together again, although they were not divorced until 1925, and their only son died in 1928.

Landis was married to Rex Smith from 1937 to 1944. In 1956, she married her third husband and widower, United States Army Major General John F. R. "Jeff" Seitz (died 1978).

Death
Landis died of cancer at Danbury Hospital in Danbury, Connecticut, on February 2, 1972, aged 75.

Complete filmography

Partial television credits

Radio appearances

References
 
Notes

External links

Jessie Royce Landis from Great Character Actors

1896 births
1972 deaths
Actresses from Chicago
American film actresses
20th-century American memoirists
American stage actresses
American television actresses
Deaths from cancer in Connecticut
20th-century American actresses
American women memoirists